John Eugene O'Donoghue (born October 7, 1939) is an American former Major League Baseball left-handed pitcher. He was signed by the Kansas City Athletics as an amateur free agent before the 1959 season and pitched for the Athletics (1963–1965), Cleveland Indians (1966–1967), Baltimore Orioles (1968), Seattle Pilots / Milwaukee Brewers (1969–1970), and Montreal Expos (1970–1971). During his nine-year major league career, O'Donoghue compiled 39 wins, 377 strikeouts, and a 4.07 earned run average. At the plate, he was 35-for-206 (.170) with three home runs, the first two against Buster Narum and the third off Denny McLain.

Playing career
He was primarily a starting pitcher during the first half of his major league career, and almost exclusively a reliever during the second half. From 1963–1967, he started in 93 of his 139 games, and from 1968–1971 relieved in 115 of his 118 games.

O'Donoghue struggled greatly during his first four minor league seasons (1959–1962), from rookie ball to Double-A. He had a combined record of 26–39 with an earned run average of 5.54. In 499 innings pitched, he had given up 307 earned runs, struck out 360, and walked 358. In 1963, at the age of 24, it all began to come together. Pitching in the Eastern League and Pacific Coast League, he had a combined record of 14–11 with an ERA of 3.10 in 33 games (25 starts), leading to his call-up to the pitching-starved Athletics.

O'Donoghue made his major league debut on September 29, 1963, the last day of the regular season. He was the starting pitcher in a home game against the Cleveland Indians at Municipal Stadium. He gave up just two runs (one earned) in six innings, but was the losing pitcher as Jim "Mudcat" Grant and the Tribe prevailed, 2–1.

O'Donoghue first major league career win came on May 12, 1964 at Dodger Stadium. He started and pitched the first seven innings against the Los Angeles Angels, giving up two unearned runs, and the A's won by a score of 6–2. John Wyatt saved the game for him with two scoreless innings.

O'Donoghue's finest major league effort was against the Detroit Tigers on August 19, 1967. He pitched a one-hit complete game shutout at Tiger Stadium that day, striking out 11 and walking only two batters. The Tigers had such players as Dick McAuliffe, Al Kaline, Willie Horton, Bill Freehan, Eddie Mathews, and Norm Cash in the lineup, but O'Donoghue was almost untouchable. Freehan got the only Tiger hit, a second-inning single, as the Indians won 5–0.

Even though O'Donoghue was named to the American League All-Star team in 1965, it probably does not qualify as his best season. He was 9–18 with a 3.95 ERA in 34 games (30 starts); the 18 losses tied him for the league lead with Boston Red Sox pitchers Bill Monbouquette and Dave Morehead. In 1967, he compiled an 8–9 record with two saves and a 3.24 ERA in 33 games (17 starts) and had his lowest career WHIP (1.171). Then, in 1969, he relieved in 55 games for the Seattle Pilots and compiled a 2–2 record with six saves and a 2.96 ERA in 70 innings.

O'Donoghue was traded along with Gordon Lund by the Indians to the Baltimore Orioles for Eddie Fisher and minor leaguers Johnny Scruggs and Bob Scott on November 28, 1967.

In 1969, the Baltimore Orioles presented the John O'Donoghue Long Ball Award to pitchers who had given up home runs after games. Jim Palmer said it was named "in honor of the former Indian who had a tendency to throw fat pitches that ended up getting hit so hard they sometimes didn't land in the same county as the baseball park."

O'Donoghue's contract was purchased by the Expos from the Brewers on June 15, 1970.

Quotes 
"Getting on the bus to go from the Biltmore Hotel to Yankee Stadium, O'Donoghue said "Well, boys, here we start our tour of the funny farm." He meant the streets of New York." — Jim Bouton in Ball Four (June 13, 1969)
"We talk a lot about not drawing fans. At the same time most of the players are still telling the fans they'll be fined $50 if they sign any autographs. If some of the guys spent as much time signing autographs as they do shooing kids we'd have a lot more friends around here. Chief kid-shooer is O'Donoghue. He enjoys the work. One of these days he's going to make another Frank Crosetti." — Jim Bouton in Ball Four (August 22, 1969)

Trivia 
O'Donoghue is the father of former major league pitcher John Preston O'Donoghue.
On July 27, 1966, at Memorial Stadium, he gave up Larry Haney's first major league home run.
Held All-Stars Paul Blair, Tony Kubek, Roger Maris, Rick Monday, Boog Powell, Zoilo Versalles, and Roy White to a .140 collective batting average (19-for-136).
Held Hall of Famers Luis Aparicio, Lou Brock, Frank Robinson, and Carl Yastrzemski to a .204 collective batting average (11-for-54).

References

External links

Retrosheet

Bibliography
1971 Baseball Register published by The Sporting News

1939 births
Living people
Albuquerque Dukes players
American expatriate baseball players in Canada
American League All-Stars
Baseball players from Kansas City, Missouri
Baltimore Orioles players
Binghamton Triplets players
Buffalo Bisons (minor league) players
Cleveland Indians players
Dallas Rangers players
Kansas City Athletics players
Lewiston Broncs players
Major League Baseball pitchers
Milwaukee Brewers players
Montreal Expos players
Pocatello Athletics players
Portsmouth-Norfolk Tides players
Rochester Red Wings players
Seattle Pilots players
Sioux City Soos players
Winnipeg Whips players
Missouri Tigers baseball players